Spencer Matthews King (August 11, 1917 in San Juan, Puerto Rico – January 20, 1988) was a U.S. Ambassador to Guyana. Appointed by President Richard Nixon on May 27, 1969, he presented his credentials to Governor-General Sir Richard Edmonds Luyt on October 15, 1969, in the capital city of Georgetown.  After Guyana declared itself a republic in 1970,  Ambassador King had to be reaccredited as ambassador, this time presenting his credentials to the republic's new president, Sir Edward Victor Luckhoo on February 23, 1970.  He represented the United States and its interests in this former British colony until March 8, 1974, when he left the post.  A longtime resident of Maine, he retired from the foreign service after his ambassadorship came to an end. He died on January 20, 1988.

External links
The Political Graveyard listing
U.S. Embassy in Guyana
List of U.S. Ambassadors to Guyana

Ambassadors of the United States to Guyana
People from San Juan, Puerto Rico
1917 births
1988 deaths
20th-century American diplomats